John Clarke (1899 – 13 November 1962) was an Irish hurler who played for Cork Senior Championship club St Finbarr's. He also had a brief career with the Cork senior hurling team, during which he lined out at centre-forward.

Honours
St Finbarr's
Cork Senior Hurling Championship (4): 1919, 1922, 1923, 1926

Cork
Munster Senior Hurling Championship (1): 1920

References

1899 births
1962 deaths
St Finbarr's hurlers
Cork inter-county hurlers